The Brazilian ironclad Rio de Janeiro was an armored gunboat ( Nr. 3) built for the Brazilian Navy during the Paraguayan War in the mid-1860s. Like the other two gunboats she was built in Brazil and was designed as a casemate ironclad. Commissioned in April 1866, the ship did not enter combat until September, when she bombarded Paraguayan fortifications at Curuzu. Rio de Janeiro hit two mines on 2 September and rapidly sank, taking 53 of her crew with her.

Design and description
Rio de Janeiro was designed to meet the need of the Brazilian Navy for a small, simple, shallow-draft armored gunboat capable of withstanding heavy fire. The hull was sheathed with Muntz metal to reduce biofouling. On riverine operations, the bulwarks and the ship's masts, were usually removed.

Her crew numbered 148 officers and men.

Propulsion
Rio de Janeiro had a single John Penn & Sons 2-cylinder steam engine driving a single 2-bladed propeller. Her engine was powered by two tubular boilers. The ship's funnel was mounted directly in front of her casemate. Rio de Janeiro carried enough coal for six days' steaming.

Armament
Rio de Janeiro mounted two 70-pounder Whitworth rifled muzzle loaders and two 68-pounder smoothbore guns in her casemate. To minimize the possibility of shells or splinters entering the casemate through the gunports they were as small as possible, allowing only a 24°-arc of fire for each gun. The rectangular,  casemate had two gun ports on each side as well as the front and rear.

All of the guns could fire both solid shot and explosive shells.

Armor
It had a maximum thickness of  covering the machinery and magazines,  elsewhere.

Service

Rio de Janeiro was laid down at the Arsenal de Marinha da Corte in Rio de Janeiro on 28 June 1865, during the Paraguayan War, which saw Argentina, Brazil and Uruguay allied against Paraguay. She was launched on 18 February 1866 and completed on 1 March 1866. Commissioned in April she reached the combat zone on 4 May. The ship reached Corrientes, with the ironclad , in July 1866. On 1 September Rio de Janeiro bombarded the Paraguayan fortifications at Curuzú in company with the other Brazilian ironclads. A 68-pounder shell entered one of her gunports during the bombardment, killing four men and wounding five. The next day, after her damage was repaired, the ship struck two floating mines ('torpedoes') in the River Paraguay while trying to rendezvous with the other Brazilian ironclads bombarding Curupayty. Rio de Janeiro sank instantly with the loss of 53 of her crew.

Footnotes

References

External links
 Brief history of Rio de Janeiro 

Ships built in Brazil
Gunboats of the Brazilian Navy
Ironclad warships of the Brazilian Navy
Maritime incidents in September 1866
Ships sunk by mines
1866 ships
Riverine warfare